"Forward" is a song recorded by American singer Beyoncé for her sixth studio album, Lemonade (2016). It was written by James Blake and Beyoncé, who is also featured in the song. The song's music video is part of a one-hour film with the same title as its parent album, originally aired on HBO.

Upon release of the album, "Forward" charted in the United States, United Kingdom and Scotland. The song was Beyoncé's 54th entry on the Billboard Hot 100, peaking at 63.

Writing and recording 
The song was written by James Blake, who is also the producer and featured artist, with additional collaboration from Beyoncé. In an interview for The Guardian, he revealed that Beyoncé had brought her four-year-old daughter Blue Ivy to hear him working. Every time Blake sang the song's hook, Blue Ivy sang: "Forward!" "That's how you know it's catchy," said Beyoncé. The song was recorded at the Conway Studios in Los Angeles, California. The instrumentalization consists of voice and piano, played by Blake.

Commercial performance 

After the release of Lemonade, "Forward" debuted on the Billboard Hot 100 chart at number 63 and the Hot R&B/Hip-Hop Songs chart at number 30. The song also charted in other countries: France at 150, Scotland at 91, and the United Kingdom at 85.

Charts

References

2016 songs
Beyoncé songs
Song recordings produced by Beyoncé
Songs written by Beyoncé
James Blake (musician) songs
Songs written by James Blake (musician)